The 1969 Ball State Cardinals football team was an American football team that represented Ball State University as an independent during the 1969 NCAA College Division football season. In its second season under head coach Wave Myers, the team compiled a 5–5 record. The team played its home games at Ball State Stadium in Muncie, Indiana.

Schedule

References

Ball State
Ball State Cardinals football seasons
Ball State Cardinals football